Victor Corces (born August 16, 1952, in Asturias, Spain) is a Professor of Human Genetics at Emory University.  His work has focused on understanding the mechanisms by which chromosomes are folded in the three-dimensional nuclear space. He was elected to the National Academy of Sciences for pioneering work in epigenetics, genomics, and computational biology. He is a member of the Spanish Royal Academy of Sciences.

References

Members of the United States National Academy of Sciences
Members of the Royal Spanish Academy
Living people
Place of birth missing (living people)
Emory University faculty
1952 births